Robert, Rob, Robbie, Bob, or Bobby Ray may refer to:

 Robert D. Ray (1928–2018), Governor of Iowa 1969 to 1983
Robert R. Ray, Reconstruction era sheriff and state legislator in Feliciana, Louisiana
 Robert Ray (artist) (1924–2002), American artist
 Robert Ray (Australian politician) (born 1947)
 Robert Ray (prosecutor) (born 1960), final Whitewater Special Counsel
 Robert D. Ray (1978–2000), one of the Ray brothers
 Robert Ray (baseball) (born 1984), baseball pitcher
 Rob Ray (born 1968), retired Canadian ice hockey player
 Bob Ray, American filmmaker
 Robbie Ray (baseball) (born 1991), American baseball pitcher
 Robbie Ray (racing driver), American racing driver
 B.o.B (Bobby Ray Simmons, Jr.), American recording artist from Georgia
 Bobby Ray (singer), American recording artist from Texas
 Bobby Ray (actor), American film comedian of the silent era
 Bobby Ray Parks Jr., Filipino professional basketball player

See also
 Robert Rae (disambiguation)